In the first edition of the tournament, Nicole Arendt and Kristine Radford won the title by defeating Amy deLone and Erika deLone 6–2, 6–2 in the final.

Seeds

Draw

Draw

References

External links
 Official results archive (ITF)
 Official results archive (WTA)

Danamon Open
1993 WTA Tour